The National Museum of Ethnology (Museum Volkenkunde), is an ethnographic museum in the Netherlands located in the university city of Leiden. As of 2014, the museum, along with the Tropenmuseum in Amsterdam, and the Africa Museum in Berg en Dal, together make up the National Museum of World Cultures.

First ethnographic museum in Europe
The institution which was at first called the "Museum Japonicum".  It was the first museum in Europe which was designed to demonstrate that collecting the artefacts of man could mean more than the mere accumulation of curiosities.  From the very outset, this innovative institution incorporated at least four basic principles: collecting, scientific research, presentation to the public, and educational guidance.

In 1816 the Koninklijk Kabinet van Zeldzaamheden was formed in the Hague as an attempt to start a museum of scientific artifacts from around the world, based on royal collections and a large group of Chinese artifacts from private collections. Thanks to the early efforts of this organization, in the early 1830s, when Philipp Franz Balthasar von Siebold abandoned the political turmoil of revolutionary Belgium for the relative calm of the University of Leiden, he was inspired by the first museum director R.P. van de Kasteele to collect Japanese objects for his collection. The resulting gift of about 5,000 objects became the heart the new museum's holdings.  Siebold's home in Leiden—and the objects he brought to Europe after eight years in Japan—was opened to the public in the early 1830s (today his collection is preserved in the SieboldHuis).  The Dutch crown had previously purchased the smaller collections of Jan Cock Blomhoff in 1826 and Johannes Gerhard Frederik van Overmeer Fischer in 1832. These which were merged with what Siebold bestowed on King William I; and they became crucial elements in the creation of what became the Museum voor Volkenkunde, or Ethnographic Museum in Leiden in 1837.  This institution would later evolve into the National Museum of Ethnology.

In 1843, Siebold also encouraged other Europeans to create ethnographic institutions similar to what was developing in Leiden.  He urged "the importance of their creation in European states possessing colonies because these institutions could become a means for understanding the subject peoples and of awakening the interest of the public and of merchants -- all of which are necessary conditions for a lucrative trade which benefits all."

Museum holdings

The collection today contains a large number of objects from Africa, China, Indonesia, Japan, Korea, Latin America, North America, Oceania, and Asia.  In developing the collection, the museum has devoted significant attention to acquiring material which illustrates the historical development of world cultures; but the genesis of the museum's holdings began with material garnered during the years Japan was officially closed except for one small island in Nagasaki harbor -- Dejima.

Blomhoff collection
As Opperhoofd (or chief trader) for the Dutch East India Company (Vereenigde Oostindische Compagnie or VOC) at Dejima island in Nagasaki harbor from 1817 through 1823, Jan Cock Blomhoff was unique.  Despite the Japanese "closed door" policy for Westerners (sakoku), he did transport his wife, Titia, and children to join him.  The Japanese predictably responded by ejecting both Blomhoff and his family; but that experience did broaden the range of household goods and other objects he accumulated across the span of his stay in Japan.

Fischer collection
Johannes Gerhard Frederik van Overmeer Fischer began as a clerk at Dejima and he was later promoted to warehouse master (pakhuismeester). During the span of his stay in Japan, Fisher's access to Japanese culture was limited; but within his universe of contacts, he was able to amass a considerable collection of "ordinary" objects which were plausibly overlooked by others. This material was brought back to the Netherlands in 1829. In 1833, he published Bijdrage tot de kennis van het Japansche rijk (Contribution to the knowledge of the Japanese Empire).

Siebold collection
As a physician practicing Western medicine in Nagasaki (1823-1829), Philipp Franz von Siebold received payment in kind with a variety of objects and artifacts which would later gain unanticipated scholarly attention in Europe. These everyday objects later became the basis of his large ethnographic collection, which consisted of everyday household goods, woodblock prints, tools and hand-crafted objects used by the Japanese people in the late Edo period. Further information relating to this material was published in Siebold's Nippon.  His professional interest was especially drawn to implements used in the practice of traditional Japanese medicine. As of 2005, a separate museum located in one of Siebold's former houses, the SieboldHuis, houses part of the collection.

Leiden plate
The Leiden plate is a Maya belt plaque and important historical artifact from Guatemala. It is depicted on the reverse of a one Guatemalan quetzal banknote.

Gallery

See also 

 Nationaal Museum van Wereldculturen
 Tropenmuseum, Amsterdam
 Edo-Tokyo Museum
 National Museum of Ethnology, Japan
 The Virtual Collection of Masterpieces

References

 Alpen, Jan van and Anthony Aris. (1995) Oriental Medicine: An Illustrated Guide to the Asian Arts of Healing.  Chicago: Serinda Publications.   
 Bolitho, Harold. (2003) "Book Review:  Titia: The First Western Woman in Japan by Rene P. Bersma," Pacific Affairs, Vol. 76, No. 4. pp. 662-663. University of British Columbia. 
 Carbonell, Bettina Messias. (2004). Museum Studies: An Anthology of Contexts. New York: Wiley-Blackwell Publishing. 
  Frederiks, Johannes Godefridus and F. Jos. van den Branden. (1888). "Johannes Gerhard Frederik van Overmeer Fischer," Biographisch woordenboek der Noord- en Zuidnederlandsche letterkunde. Amsterdam: L.J. Veen.
 Otterspeer, W. (1989). Leiden Oriental Connections, 1850-1940, Vol. V: Studies in the History of Leiden University. Leiden: E. J. Brill.  (paper)
  Siebold, Philipp Franz von. (1843).  Lettre sur l'utilité des Musées Ethnographiques et sur l'importance de leur création dans états européens qui posèdents des Colonies.  Paris: Librarie de l'Institut.
 Rudolf Effert: Royal cabinets and auxiliary branches : origins of the National Museum of Ethnology, 1816-1883. Leiden, 2008. 
Edo-Tokyo Museum exhibition catalog. (2000). A Very Unique Collection of Historical Significance: The Kapitan (the Dutch Chief) Collection from the Edo Period—The Dutch Fascination with Japan. Catalog of "400th Anniversary Exhibition Regarding Relations between Japan and the Netherlands," a joint project of the Edo-Tokyo Museum, the City of Nagasaki, the National Museum of Ethnology, the National Natuurhistorisch Museum and the National Herbarium of the Netherlands in Leiden, the Netherlands. Tokyo.
  Topstukken van Rijksmuseum Volkenkunde. KIT Publishers, Amsterdam, 2013.

External links

 Website for Rijksmuseum voor Volkenkunde (in English)
 International Centre for the Study of the Preservation and Restoration of Cultural Property (ICCROM)

National museums of the Netherlands
Museums in Leiden
Ethnographic museums in the Netherlands
Pre-Columbian art museums
Asian art museums in the Netherlands
Science and technology in the Netherlands
Archaeological museums in the Netherlands
Museums established in 1837
1837 establishments in the Netherlands
19th-century architecture in the Netherlands